Christy Martin may refer to:

Christy Martin (footballer), former Irish footballer
Christy Martin (boxer) (born 1968), female boxer

See also 
 Christopher Martin (disambiguation)
 Chris Martin (disambiguation)